Events from the year 1777 in Denmark.

Incumbents
 Monarch – Christian VII
 Prime minister – Ove Høegh-Guldberg

Events
 23 July – The brothers Jørgen Wichmand and Thomas Frederik Wichmand were ennobled by letters patent under the name Wichfeld.
 2 September  HD;S Justitia is launched at Orlogsværftet on Nyholm in Copenhagen.

Undated
 The pioneer acting academy Det Dramatiske Selskab is founded. 
 Danish India i turned over to the government by the Danish East Asia Company and becomes a Danish crown colony.
 Peter Johansen establishes the shipyard Petersværft on his new Petersgaard estate.

Births
 21 February  Christian Wulff, naval officer (died 1943)
 9 May – Johannes Søbøtker, merchant, plantation owner and governor (died 1854) 
 14 August - Hans Christian Ørsted, physicist and chemist, discoverer of electromagnetism (died 1851)
 15 October  Christian David Gebauer, painter (died 1831)
 16 October - Johan Ludwig Lund, painter (died 1867)
 27 October – Lauritz Nicolai Hvidt, businessman (died 1856)
 18 November  Thomas Blom, master mason and architect (died 1841)
 23 December – Johan Christian Drewsen, businessman and agronomist (died 1953)

Deaths

References

 
1770s in Denmark
Denmark
Years of the 18th century in Denmark